Pierre Motin (1566–1612) was a French poet and translator.

1566 births
1612 deaths
French translators
Writers from Bourges
French male poets
French male non-fiction writers